The 2006 United States Senate election in Pennsylvania was held on November 7, 2006. Incumbent Republican Rick Santorum ran for re-election to a third term, but was defeated by Democrat Bob Casey, Jr., the son of former Pennsylvania governor 
Bob Casey Sr. Casey was elected to serve between January 3, 2007 and January 3, 2013.

Santorum trailed Casey in every public poll taken during the campaign.  Casey's margin of victory (nearly 18% of those who voted) was the largest ever for a Democratic Senate nominee in Pennsylvania, the largest margin of victory for a Senate challenger in the 2006 elections, and the largest general election margin of defeat for an incumbent U.S. Senator since 1980. Casey was the first Pennsylvania Democrat to win a full term in the Senate since Joseph S. Clark Jr. in 1962, and the first Democrat to win a Senate election since 1991. He was the first Democrat to win a full term for this seat since 1940. 

As of 2022, this was the last time the following counties have voted Democratic in a Senate election: Greene, Washington, Westmoreland, Somerset, Lawrence, Mercer, Armstrong, Indiana, Cambria, Warren, Forest, Elk, Clearfield, Clinton, Schuylkill, Columbia, and Carbon.

Democratic primary 
The Democratic primary was held May 16, 2006.

Candidates 
 Bob Casey, Jr., State Treasurer, former State Auditor General, candidate for Governor in 2002 and son of former Governor Bob Casey, Sr.
 Chuck Pennacchio, University of the Arts history professor
 Alan Sandals, attorney

Declined 
 Barbara Hafer, former State Auditor General and State Treasurer
 Joe Hoeffel, U.S. Representative

Results 
Casey won a landslide victory in the primary.

Republican primary 
John Featherman, who ran against Santorum in 2000 as a Libertarian, had been expected to challenge him in the 2006 Republican primary.  However, Featherman withdrew his candidacy after a GOP petition challenge because he did not have the necessary number of signatures to get on the ballot. As a result, Santorum won the Republican nomination unopposed.

Candidates 
 Rick Santorum, incumbent U.S. Senator and former U.S. congressman for Pennsylvania's 18th congressional district (1991–1995)

General election

Candidates

Major 
 Bob Casey, Jr. (D), State Treasurer
 Rick Santorum (R), incumbent U.S. Senator

Minor 
 Carl Romanelli (G), rail industry consultant, and was removed from the ballot by a Commonwealth Court judge on September 25, 2006 following a challenge from Democrats for failing to collect enough valid signatures required of third-party candidates. He lost the appeal to the state Supreme Court challenging the required number of signatures, on October 3, 2006 Carl Romanelli was ordered to pay more than $80,000 in legal fees stemming from his failed effort to make the ballot.
 Kate Michelman (I), former president of NARAL Pro-Choice America. She decided against running and tacitly endorsed Casey in March 2006

Campaign

Santorum's support for Arlen Specter 

Republican strategists took Santorum's primary result in 2006 as a bad omen, in which he ran unopposed for the Republican nomination. Republican gubernatorial nominee Lynn Swann, also unopposed, garnered 22,000 more votes statewide than Santorum in the primary, meaning thousands of Republican voters abstained from endorsing Santorum for another Senate term. This may have been partly due to Santorum's support for Arlen Specter, over Congressman Pat Toomey in the 2004 Republican primary for the U.S. Senate.  Even though Santorum is only slightly less conservative than Toomey, he joined virtually all of the state and national Republican establishment in supporting the moderate Specter.  This led many socially and fiscally conservative Republicans to consider Santorum's support of Specter to be a betrayal of their cause. However, Santorum says he supported Specter to avoid risking a Toomey loss in the general election, which would prevent President George W. Bush's judicial nominees from getting through the Senate. Santorum says Supreme Court Justice Samuel Alito would not have been confirmed without the help of Specter, who was chairman of the Senate Judiciary Committee at the time.

Santorum's controversial views 

In the Senate, Santorum was an outspoken conservative from a state with a history of electing moderates.  This led many political commentators to speculate that his low approval ratings were due to some of his more controversial statements and opinions.

Among these controversies were his views on the privatization of Social Security and the teaching of intelligent design in public schools.  In addition, his involvement in the Terri Schiavo case was considered by many in his state to be out of place.

All this left Santorum in a precarious position throughout the race.  On May 31, 2006, the polling firm Rasmussen Reports declared that Santorum was the "most vulnerable incumbent" among the Senators running for re-election. SurveyUSA polling taken right before the election showed that Santorum was the least popular of all 100 Senators, with a 38% approval rating and a net approval rating of -19%.

Santorum's residency 
While Santorum maintained a small residence in Penn Hills, a township near Pittsburgh, his family primarily lived in a large house in Leesburg, a suburb of Washington, D.C. in Northern Virginia.  Santorum faced charges of hypocrisy from critics who noted the similarities between his living situation and that of former Representative Doug Walgren, who Santorum defeated in 1990.  Back then, Santorum had claimed that Walgren was out of touch with his district; these claims were backed up with commercials showing Walgren's home in the Virginia suburbs.

On NBC's Meet the Press on September 3, 2006, Santorum admitted that he only spent "maybe a month a year, something like that" at his Pennsylvania residence.

Santorum also drew criticism for enrolling five of his six children in an online "cyber school" in Pennsylvania's Allegheny County (home to Pittsburgh and most of its suburbs), despite the fact that the children lived in Virginia. The Penn Hills School District was billed $73,000 in tuition for the cyber classes.

Casey's momentum 
Santorum began his contrast campaign against Casey early, charging him with relentlessly seeking higher political office and failing to take definitive stands on issues.  While these charges kept the race competitive, in late September and through October, Casey's campaign seemed to regain the momentum it had had throughout most of the campaign, as most polls showed Casey widening his lead after a summer slump.  In a Quinnipiac University Polling Institute poll, released on September 26, 2006, Casey was favored by 14 points.  An October 18, 2006 poll conducted by Rasmussen Reports showed Casey with a similar double-digit lead.  In the Rasmussen poll, only 46% of voters surveyed had a favorable view of Santorum, while 57% of voters viewed Casey favorably.

Negative advertisements 
At least one of Santorum's television ads called into question his campaign's use of the facts regarding Casey and people who had donated money to the Casey campaign.  The ad, which aired in September, showed several men seated around a table, while talking amongst themselves and smoking cigars, inside a jail cell. While none of the figures, who were played by actors, were named personally, the narrator provided the job descriptions, previous donations to Casey, and ethical and/or legal troubles of each. The Santorum campaign later provided the names of the people portrayed. An editorial in Casey's hometown newspaper, The Times-Tribune, pointed out that all but one of the contributions "[was] made to Casey campaigns when he was running for other offices, at which time none of the contributors were known to be under investigation for anything."  In fact, two of the persons cited in the Santorum campaign ad had actually given contributions to Santorum's 2006 Senate campaign. Another of the figures portrayed had died in 2004. Political scientist Larry Sabato called the ad "over the top" and suspected that the fallout would hurt Santorum.

Debates
Complete video of debate, September 3, 2006
Complete video of debate, October 12, 2006
Complete video of debate, October 16, 2006

Predictions

Polling

Results 

At 9:45 PM EST on Election Night, Santorum called Casey to concede defeat.

By congressional district
Bob Casey Jr won 14 of 19 congressional districts, including the 3rd, 6th, 15th and 18th  districts, which elected Republicans to the House.

See also 
 2006 United States Senate elections

References

External links 
 Casey's United States Senate Website
 Santorum's Campaign Website (archived from November 2, 2006)
 Casey's Campaign Website (archived from November 16, 2006)
 On the Issues: Rick Santorum
 On the Issues: Bob Casey
 Washington Post Analysis on Senate Race

Pennsylvania
2006
Rick Santorum
2006 Pennsylvania elections